Joseph Normand (4 December 1894 – 25 May 1979) was a French racing cyclist. He rode in the 1920 Tour de France.

References

External links
 

1894 births
1979 deaths
French male cyclists
Place of birth missing